Anil Kumar Bajpai (born 26 February 1957) is an Indian politician and former member of the Sixth Legislative Assembly of Delhi. He represented the Gandhi Nagar constituency of Delhi and is a member of the Bharatiya Janta Party political party.

Early  life and education
Anil Kumar Bajpai was born in  Farrukhabad. He attended the Chaudhary Charan Singh University and attained Bachelor of Arts degree.

Political career
Anil Kumar Bajpai has been a MLA for one term. He represented the Gandhi Nagar constituency and is a member of the Bharatiya Janata Party political party.

Posts

See also
Aam Aadmi Party
Delhi Legislative Assembly
Government of India
Politics of India
Sixth Legislative Assembly of Delhi

References 

1957 births
Aam Aadmi Party politicians from Delhi
Delhi MLAs 2015–2020
Delhi MLAs 2020–2025
Living people
People from Farrukhabad district
Bharatiya Janata Party politicians from Delhi